Peter Ding Lingbin (born 20 July 1962) is a Chinese Catholic priest and bishop of the Roman Catholic Diocese of Lu'an since  November 2016.

Biography
Ding was born into a Catholic family, and graduated from Changzhi Medical College in 1982. He was ordained a priest in 1992. In the second half of 2013, he was appointed coadjutor bishop of the Roman Catholic Diocese of Lu'an by the Holy See, and was promoted to bishop in 2016.

References

1962 births
Living people
Changzhi Medical College alumni
Chinese Roman Catholic bishops